Currawong, New South Wales, is rural locality of Hilltops Council and is a civil parish of Harden County, New South Wales.

The nearest towns are Harden, New South Wales to the south and Wombat, New South Wales to the west.

References

Localities in New South Wales
Geography of New South Wales